Björn Leukemans (born 1 July 1977 in Deurne) is a Belgian former professional road bicycle racer. During 2008 Leukemans was suspended for doping with artificial testosterone. In 2009 he joined the  team. Leukemans joined  for the 2014 season, after his previous team –  – folded at the end of the 2013 season. Leukemans retired in 2015.

Major results

1999
 1st Stage 2 Vuelta a Navarra
 2nd Road race, National Under-23 Road Championships
 3rd Circuit de Wallonie
 3rd Zesbergenprijs Harelbeke
 5th Hasselt–Spa–Hasselt
 6th Road race, UCI Under-23 Road World Championships
 7th Zellik–Galmaarden
 9th Overall Le Triptyque des Monts et Châteaux
 9th Flèche Namuroise
2000
 1st Stage 2 Dekra Open Stuttgart
 2nd Overall Tour de la Région Wallonne
 6th Druivenkoers Overijse
 8th Grand Prix d'Isbergues
2001
 2nd Grote Prijs Jef Scherens
 3rd GP Stad Vilvoorde
 5th Zellik–Galmaarden
 7th Schaal Sels
 8th Grand Prix d'Isbergues
 9th Scheldeprijs
 9th Cras Avernas
2002
 1st Grote Prijs Beeckman-De Caluwé
 4th Overall Tour de la Région Wallonne
 5th Overall Course de la Solidarité Olympique
1st Stage 3
 5th Cholet-Pays de Loire
 5th Veenendaal–Veenendaal Classic
 6th Druivenkoers Overijse
2003
 4th Ronde van Drenthe
 5th Brussels–Ingooigem
 10th Classic Haribo
2004
 1st Stage 5 Tour of Belgium
 3rd Grote Prijs Stad Zottegem
 4th Rund um Köln
 4th Polynormande
 5th Clásica de Almería
 6th Rund um den Henninger Turm
 9th Route Adélie
2005
 2nd Grote Prijs Jef Scherens
 2nd Grand Prix de Wallonie
 7th Amstel Gold Race
2006
 5th Grand Prix d'Ouverture La Marseillaise
 5th Rund um den Henninger Turm
 6th Giro del Piemonte
2007
 1st Stage 4 Tour of Austria
 4th Paris–Roubaix
 4th Druivenkoers Overijse
 7th Brabantse Pijl
 9th Halle–Ingooigem
 10th Rund um die Hainleite
 10th Grand Prix de Wallonie
2009
 3rd Le Samyn
 4th Brabantse Pijl
 6th Halle–Ingooigem
 7th Overall Étoile de Bessèges
1st Stage 4
 8th Tour of Flanders
 10th Overall Tour du Limousin
2010
 1st Druivenkoers Overijse
 2nd Dwars door Vlaanderen
 4th Tour of Flanders
 4th Grote Prijs Jef Scherens
 6th Overall Tour de Luxembourg
 6th Paris–Roubaix
 6th Grand Prix de Wallonie
 7th Overall Ster Elektrotoer
 7th E3 Prijs Vlaanderen
 7th Brabantse Pijl
2011
 1st Overall Tour du Limousin
1st Stage 1
 1st Druivenkoers Overijse
 2nd Brabantse Pijl
 3rd Overall Tour of Belgium
 3rd Grand Prix de Wallonie
 6th Grand Prix Cycliste de Québec
 7th Tour of Flanders
 7th Amstel Gold Race
 9th Overall Tour de Luxembourg
 9th Liège–Bastogne–Liège
2012
 1st Druivenkoers Overijse
 1st Stadsprijs Geraardsbergen
 3rd Grand Prix de Wallonie
 4th Grote Prijs Jef Scherens
 6th Grand Prix Cycliste de Montréal
 7th Paris–Bourges
 7th Paris–Tours
 8th Overall Circuit de Lorraine
2013
 1st Druivenkoers Overijse
 2nd Binche–Chimay–Binche
 3rd Brabantse Pijl
 5th Heistse Pijl
 6th Grand Prix Impanis-Van Petegem
 7th Amstel Gold Race
 9th Grand Prix d'Ouverture La Marseillaise
 10th Grand Prix of Aargau Canton
2014
 2nd Overall Tour du Limousin
1st Stage 1
 4th Druivenkoers Overijse
 5th Brabantse Pijl
 6th Overall Tour de Picardie
 9th Tour of Flanders
 9th Brussels Cycling Classic
 9th Grand Prix Impanis-Van Petegem
 10th Overall Tour de Luxembourg
2015
 1st Ronde van Limburg
 1st Grote Prijs Jef Scherens
 1st Stadsprijs Geraardsbergen

References

External links 

 
 
 
 
 
 Palmares at CyclingBase

1977 births
Living people
Belgian male cyclists
People from Deurne, Belgium
Cyclists from Antwerp Province